Tooth regeneration is a stem cell based regenerative medicine procedure in the field of tissue engineering and stem cell biology to replace damaged or lost teeth by regrowing them from autologous stem cells.

As a source of the new bioengineered teeth, somatic stem cells are collected and reprogrammed to induced pluripotent stem cells which can be placed in the dental lamina directly or placed in a reabsorbable biopolymer in the shape of the new tooth.

History
Young et al. first demonstrated in 2002 that teeth could be regenerated from cells.

See also

 Epithelial cell rests of Malassez
 Polyphyodont
 Regenerative endodontics
 Socket preservation
 Tooth development

References

Restorative dentistry
Emerging technologies